Sick is a 2022 American slasher film directed by John Hyams and written by Kevin Williamson and Katelyn Crabb. The film stars Gideon Adlon, Beth Million, and Dylan Sprayberry. 

Sick premiered at the Toronto International Film Festival on September 11, 2022, and was released on January 13, 2023, by Peacock.

Plot
In April 2020, college student Tyler Murphy is stalked by an anonymous figure while shopping at a grocery store. When Tyler gets home, the masked intruder ambushes and kills him.

Parker Mason takes her best friend, Miri Woodlow, to her family's lake house to quarantine. They arrive at the isolated lake house when Parker receives a cryptic text message. The girls head to a small dock to tan, and Parker receives another message, unsettling them both. Later that day, the two play a drinking game about Dr. Anthony Fauci while watching the news. An unknown visitor arrives in the driveway and is unresponsive when he knocks on the door. Parker heads outside with a knife, but sees no one. The figure enters through the backdoor, but it is revealed to be DJ, Parker's fling who came to the lake house uninvited. Now night, the three smoke marijuana and dance before deciding to go to sleep. After Miri leaves for her room, DJ confronts Parker about an Instagram post which showed her kissing someone named Benji at a party. DJ proposes that they be committed partners, but Parker disagrees and DJ agrees to leave the house in the morning. DJ then goes to his car, but a masked figure enters the house while his back is turned.  

While everyone is sleeping, the intruder steals their phones. DJ and Parker wake up when loud music begins to play from downstairs. After he saw the intruder, DJ tells Parker to get out of the house and wait in his car. Outside, Parker sees the intruder sneak into Miri's room through the window, and screams to wake her up. Miri runs to join Parker in the car while DJ grapples with the intruder inside. DJ nearly gets away, but the intruder stabs him multiple times when he is knocked down. When the door opens and DJ shuffles outside, Parker leaves the car to investigate. She soon realizes that DJ's feet are not touching the ground, and the intruder is holding DJ up with a tapestry banner that is pierced in his back. He then kills DJ, and chases after the girls who drive away in the car. The car gets stuck, and the intruder chases them.   

Miri and Parker run to the roof, but Miri is pushed off to the ground. Parker runs to the kitchen and beats the intruder down. A second intruder then enters and is distraught to see that their counterpart is wounded, presumably dead. Parker runs outside to find Miri alive, but with a broken leg, and tells Miri to play dead. The second intruder, believing Miri deceased, chases Parker towards the lake. She detaches a floating dock and rows herself towards the neighbor's house. In the middle of the lake, the intruder appears from the water, stabbing Parker and forcing her to swim the rest of the way. She arrives at the neighbor's house who confronts her with a shotgun before agreeing to call the police. Unfortunately, he is immediately stabbed, and the intruder once again pursues Parker, now with a shotgun in his arsenal.  Meanwhile, Miri makes her way back into the house and crafts a splint from a chair leg and cling wrap. The first intruder regains consciousness and attacks Miri, who ultimately subdues him with a fatal stab.

Parker makes it to the main road and momentarily knocks the intruder down as a car approaches. She begs the woman who is driving to help her, but the driver insists she put a mask before entering the car, which exasperates Parker. The driver offers Parker a spare mask, which turns out to be laced with chloroform, knocking her out. The driver and the intruder head back to the lake house with Parker and performs a COVID-19 test on her. The two are revealed to be a husband and wife named Jason and Pamela, and the deceased intruder is their older son. They reveal that Benji, the boy Parker was seen kissing on Instagram, is their younger son who has since died of COVID-19.  They suspect that Parker infected him at the party, as her COVID-19 test reveals that she is positive, and they wish to avenge him by killing her.  They also confess to the murder of Tyler Murphy, as he was the one who infected Parker.  Miri attempts to contact 911 via a laptop, but Jason notices the active Wi-Fi and destroys the router. Concerned that Miri may not be dead after all, Jason heads outside to investigate. Pamela threatens Parker, but Miri sneaks up and knocks her unconscious. The two defenestrate her, and after Jason gives them chase through the home, they push him over a landing to be impaled on deer antlers, killing him.  Parker and Miri escape to a nearby barn to find a new mode of transportation, but before they can leave, Pamela arrives and attacks them. While fighting with Parker, Pamela gets drenched in gasoline, and Miri is able to set her on fire. The police arrive as the two friends watch Pamela burn to death.

Cast
 Gideon Adlon as Parker Mason
 Beth Million as Miri Woodlow
 Dylan Sprayberry as DJ Cole
 Marc Menchaca as Jason
 Jane Adams as Pamela
 Joel Courtney as Tyler 
 Chris Reid as Jeb
 Duane Stephens as Mr. Lyons
 Logan Murphy as Benji

Production
In May 2021, it was announced that Miramax greenlit the film with Kevin Williamson and Katelyn Crabb attached to write, along with John Hyams to direct, and Gideon Adlon to star.  Principal photography was completed in the summer of 2021 in and around Weber County, Utah.

Release
Sick premiered at the Toronto International Film Festival on September 11, 2022. The first trailer was released on January 6, 2023, revealing the film would premiere on Peacock the following week on January 13, 2023.

Reception

References

External links
 
 
 

2022 films
2022 horror films
2020s American films
2020s English-language films
2020s slasher films
American slasher films
Blumhouse Productions films
Films about the COVID-19 pandemic
Films directed by John Hyams
Films produced by Bill Block
Films set in 2020
Films shot in Utah
Films with screenplays by Kevin Williamson
Miramax films
Peacock (streaming service) original films